Carl Eugene Brazley (born September 5, 1957 in Louisville, Kentucky) is a former football player in the Canadian Football League for thirteen years. Brazley played defensive back for the Montreal Alouettes, Ottawa Rough Riders and Toronto Argonauts from 1980 to 1992. He was a CFL All-Star in 1983, the same season he won the Grey Cup with the Argonauts. Brazley also played for the San Diego Chargers as a replacement player in 1987. He played college football at Western Kentucky University. He ended his 13-year career in 1993, playing with the Toronto Argonauts. 

He has a wife Jan, a son Nikolas, and a daughter Sunni who all live in Louisville, Kentucky. Nikolas played for the Kentucky as a wide receiver from 2006 to 2011.

1957 births
Living people
Western Kentucky Hilltoppers football players
Montreal Alouettes players
Ottawa Rough Riders players
Toronto Argonauts players
San Diego Chargers players
American players of Canadian football
Canadian football defensive backs
Players of American football from Louisville, Kentucky
Players of Canadian football from Louisville, Kentucky
Seneca College alumni